Linda Evans is a Welsh international lawn and indoor bowler.

Bowls career
Linda was part of the fours team that won the gold medal at the 1986 Commonwealth Games in Edinburgh and also won a bronze medal in the fours at the 2004 World Outdoor Bowls Championship in Leamington Spa.

In 1993, she won the fours silver medal at the inaugural Atlantic Bowls Championships.

She was selected as one of the Welsh coaches at the 2010 Commonwealth Games and is a representative of the Welsh Bowls Federation.

References 

Welsh female bowls players
Living people
Commonwealth Games medallists in lawn bowls
Commonwealth Games gold medallists for Wales
Year of birth missing (living people)
Bowls players at the 1986 Commonwealth Games
Medallists at the 1986 Commonwealth Games